The Nordic Junior Athletics Championships is an annual outdoor track and field competition for athletes under-20 from the Nordic countries – Sweden, Norway, Finland, Denmark, and Iceland. Athletes must be 19 years of age or younger by December 31 of the year the championship is held. Finland and Sweden have chosen to set a lower age limit of 18, except for athletes competing in relay races only. Norway, Denmark and Iceland have chosen not to have a lower age limit.

The competition was founded in 1950 as the Nordic U21 Junior Match. For much of its early history, it was a competition between Finland, Sweden and Norway only, with that being the arrangement until 1983, with exceptions of the 1962, 1964, and 1979 championships. The competition broadened to include all Nordic states from 1983 onwards, with the exception of the period from 1989-93. The competition was renamed in 2004 to align with the International Association of Athletics Federations definitions of a "junior athlete" as under-20 rather than under-21.

The competition is organised by Nordic Athletics, which also holds the Nordic 10000m Challenge, Nordic Indoor Match and Nordic Cross Country Championships. A separate under-20 event is held for combined track and field events.

Editions

References

Nordic Athletics competitions
Recurring sporting events established in 1950
1950 establishments in Sweden
Under-20 athletics competitions